Pierre Perrin (c.1620 – 24 April 1675) was a French poet and librettist.

Perrin, sometimes known as L'Abbé Perrin although he never belonged to the clergy, was born in Lyon. He founded the Académie d'Opéra, which later was renamed the Académie Royale de Musique when control of it passed to Jean-Baptiste Lully.

He worked with Robert Cambert, creating with him La Pastorale d'Issy in 1659, and with Jean-Baptiste Boësset, creating La Mort d'Adonis, in 1662. With Cambert, he also created Pomone, which inaugurated the opening of the first "salle de l'Opéra" in 1671, of which he had obtained the privilege from King Louis XIV. He also presented there his Les peines et les plasirs de l'amour.

A poor administrator and the victim of dishonest collaborators, Perrin was imprisoned for debts and had to sell his privilege to Lully in 1672. He died in poverty in Paris, aged about 55.

His verses are now considered mediocre, but his name remains associated with the birth of opera as an art form in France.

See also 
 Plaude Laetare Gallia

References

Sources
 Le guide de l'opéra, les indispensables de la musique, R.Mancini & J.J.Rouvereux, (Fayard, 1986),

External links 
 His plays and their presentations on CÉSAR

1620s births
1675 deaths
Writers from Lyon
French opera librettists
17th-century French dramatists and playwrights
17th-century French poets
17th-century French male writers
Directors of the Paris Opera